Chicago Sinai Congregation (founded in 1861) is a notable American Jewish congregation associated with Reform Judaism located in Chicago.

History 
Founded in 1861, Chicago Sinai Congregation was the first reform congregation to be established in Chicago. During the nineteenth century, the congregation helped pioneer and promote the controversial ritual reform of the Sunday Sabbath (substituting Saturday for Sunday) for Jewish communities in America.

In the late nineteenth century, the congregation became the site of speculation concerning the possibility of a woman rabbi in the United States. In 1897, Hannah G. Solomon of Chicago was touted in the press as America's first woman rabbi following her preaching at the congregation. Solomon later reported that the invitation to speak was offered by Rabbi Emil Hirsch and that Hirsch's practice to allow Jewish women to speak from the pulpit was later adopted by other congregations.

Rabbis 
The early rabbis to have served in the congregation include Isaac Leow Chronik (served from 1866-1871), Kaufmann Kohler (served from 1871 to 1880), Emil G. Hirsch (served from 1880-1923). Rabbis in the twentieth century include Richard C. Hertz (served from 1947-1953), and Philip N. Kranz (served from 1971-1980).

Gallery

References 

Synagogues in Chicago
Reform Judaism and women
Reform synagogues in Illinois
Organizations established in 1861